Fantastic Planet is the debut studio album of DIN, released in 1992 by DOVe. The album comprises remixes, remakes and previously unreleased compositions.

Reception
Option compared the music of Fantastic Planet favorably to Kraftwerk and said "this style of electronic techno dance just won't get any better than this"

Track listing

Personnel
Adapted from the Fantastic Planet liner notes.

DIN
 Jean-Claude Cutz (as Din and Pupka Frey) – synthesizer, drums, photography

Production and design
 Heiki Sillaste – cover art, illustrations, design

Release history

References

External links 
 
 Fantastic Planet at iTunes

1992 debut albums
DIN (musician) albums